Hinesburg is the primary village and a census-designated place (CDP) in the town of Hinesburg, Chittenden County, Vermont, United States. As of the 2020 census, it had a population of 872, out of 4,698 in the entire town of Hinesburg.

The village is in southern Chittenden County, slightly northwest of the center of the town of Hinesburg. It is in the valley of the La Platte River, which flows northwest to Lake Champlain in the town of Shelburne. Vermont Route 116 passes through the village, leading north  to South Burlington and south  to Bristol.

References 

Populated places in Chittenden County, Vermont
Census-designated places in Chittenden County, Vermont
Census-designated places in Vermont